Serena may refer to:

Arts and entertainment
 Serena (genre), a 13th-century Occitan poetic genre
 Serena (1962 film), a British crime thriller
 Serena (2014 film), an American drama film starring Jennifer Lawrence and Bradley Cooper
 Serena: The Other Side of Greatness, a TV documentary about the tennis player Serena Williams
 Serena (novel), by Ron Rash
 Serena (video game), a horror adventure game

Brands and enterprises
 Nissan Serena, a minivan
 Serena Hotels, which operates hotels and resorts in East and Southern Africa and South Asia
 Serena Software, an American company

People
 Serena (given name)
 Serena (surname)
 Serena (actress), pornographic actress

Places
Séréna, a town in Burkina Faso
Serena Township, LaSalle County, Illinois, United States
Serena, Illinois, an unincorporated community and census-designated place in LaSalle County
Serena Waterpark, in Lahnus, Espoo, Finland

Other uses
Costa Serena, a ship

See also
La Serena (disambiguation)
Serena libre, an alcoholic cocktail
Serina (disambiguation)
Sirena (journal), a journal of poetry and art